The 1996 National Hockey League All-Star Game took place at the FleetCenter in Boston on January 20, 1996. The 46th game was originally scheduled to take place in 1995, but the lockout of the 1994–95 NHL season led to its postponement.

Super Skills Competition
The Western Conference would win their third-straight Skills Competition on a second round tie-breaking penalty shot goal.  In the individual events Sergei Fedorov tied the record for Fastest Skater (13.510s '93 Gartner), only a few races later to have Mike Gartner break his previous record by finishing the event at 13.386 seconds, which stood as the record until Dylan Larkin scored a 13.172 second skate in 2016. Mark Messier would win the Accuracy Shooting event by becoming the second player to hit four targets on four shots.

Individual Event winners
 Puck Control Relay – Pierre Turgeon (Montreal Canadiens)
 Fastest Skater – Mike Gartner (Toronto Maple Leafs) – 13.386 seconds
 Accuracy Shooting – Mark Messier (New York Rangers) – 4 hits, 4 shots
 Hardest Shot – Dave Manson (Winnipeg Jets) – 98.0 mph
 Goaltenders Competition - Dominik Hasek (Buffalo Sabres) - 4 GA, 16 shots

The game
Boston Bruins' defensemen Ray Bourque scored with just 37.3 seconds remaining in regulation to lift the Eastern Conference to a 5–4 victory in front of the home crowd in Boston.  For his heroics, the 17-year veteran was named All-Star M.V.P.

The East built a 2–0 lead after the first period as New Jersey Devils' goaltender Martin Brodeur was able to stop all 12 shots.  Philadelphia Flyers' Eric Lindros and New York Rangers' Pat Verbeek opened the scoring in the first period.  In the second period, Pittsburgh Penguins' Jaromir Jagr would score to increase the East lead to 3–0.  However, the Western Conference responded by scoring three of the next four goals in the second period to pull within one, going into the third.  Winnipeg Jets' Teemu Selanne would tie the game at 4–4 with 3:29 remaining, before Bourque scored the winning goal.

Additional information
This was also the first game where the FoxTrax was used in the All-Star Game. Jim Kelley revealed on Prime Time Sports that Dominik Hasek, the winning goaltender, was chosen as the game MVP but he overruled the vote because Bourque scored the game winner and the game was in Boston, where Bourque played most of his career.  The losing goaltender was the Chicago Blackhawks' Ed Belfour, starting his fourth All-Star Game. The third Eastern Conference goaltender, Jim Carey of the Washington Capitals, would later in the 1995–96 NHL season win the Vezina Trophy as hockey's best goaltender.  All three Eastern Conference goalies, and Western Conference goalie Chris Osgood were making their All-Star debuts in Boston.

Beginning with this year's All Star Game, the head coaches were selected by whose team had the best regular season record in his respective conference, during the season up to the All Star break. Before this, the head coaches of the previous season's Stanley Cup finalist were chosen.

Summary

Referee: Mark Faucette
Linesmen: Ron Asselstine, Brad Lazarowich
Television: Fox

Rosters

See also
1995–96 NHL season

Notes

Even though he participated in the Super Skills Competition, Dave Manson was not in the Western Conference All-Star roster.
Pavel Bure was voted as a starter, but was not able to play due to injury. Paul Kariya was his replacement in the starting lineup.

Murphy replaced Gary Suter, who was injured, in the lineup.

References
 

All-Star Game
National Hockey League All-Star Games
Ice hockey competitions in Boston
National Hockey League All-Star
National Hockey League All-Star Game